Bryan or Brian Townsend may refer to:

 Bryan Townsend (American politician) (born 1981), Delaware State Senator
 Bryan Townsend (Irish politician) (1660–1726), Irish politician
 Brian Townsend (poker player) (born 1982), American professional poker player
 Brian Townsend (American football) (born 1968), former American football player